The Edward Knox Haseltine House, located in Portland, Oregon, was added to the National Register of Historic Places on November 15, 1984. However, the site was delisted from the Register on December 28, 1994.

See also
 National Register of Historic Places listings in Southwest Portland, Oregon

References

1886 establishments in Oregon
Former National Register of Historic Places in Oregon
Houses in Portland, Oregon
Houses completed in 1886
Neoclassical architecture in Oregon
Italianate architecture in Oregon
Southwest Portland, Oregon